The 1970 Football Championship of Ukrainian SSR (Class B) was the 40th season of association football competition of the Ukrainian SSR, which was part of the Ukrainian Class B. It was the twentieth and last season in the Soviet Class B and the eighth season of the Ukrainian Class B. 

The 1970 Football Championship of Ukrainian SSR (Class B) was won by FC Khimik Severodonetsk.

Reorganization
In 1970–1971 the Soviet football league structure went through reformation. The Soviet Class A introduced an extra tier expanding from two to three in total. To the previous First and Second groups, there was introduced Higher (or Top) group. With this, many clubs that previously competed at the second tier (Second Group) were relegated to lower third tier (Second Group). Because of that, many clubs also moved two tiers either up the league's ladder.

The 1970 Ukrainian Class B season was the last and the Soviet Class B competition were disbanded.

Teams

Location map

Relegated teams
Three clubs were relegated from the 1969 Second Group (Class A).
 FC Lokomotyv Vinnytsia
 FC Khimik Severodonetsk
 FC Dynamo Khmelnytskyi

Promoted teams
 FC Shakhtar Kirovsk

Relocated and renamed teams
 none

Qualification stage

Zone 1

Zone 2

Final stage
All points earn by each team were carried over to the final stage.

For 1–14 places

For 15–27 places

See also
 Soviet Second League

External links
 1970 season regulations.  Luhansk football portal
 1970 Soviet championships (all leagues) at helmsoccer.narod.ru

1970
4
Soviet
Soviet
class B
Football Championship of the Ukrainian SSR